Violeta Slović (born 30 August 1991) is a Serbian football defender currently playing for in the Serbian First League for ZFK Spartak Subotica, with which she made her Champions League debut in August 2011. In the next edition she scored the winning goal over Pärnu JK that marked Spartak's qualification to the Round of 32 for the first time. She is a member of the Serbian national team.

Honours 
Spartak Subotica
Winner
 Serbian Super Liga (5): 2010-11, 2011–12, 2012–13, 2013–14, 2014–15
 Serbian Women's Cup (4): 2011–12, 2012–13, 2013–14, 2014–15

International goals

References

External links
 

1991 births
Living people
Serbian women's footballers
Serbia women's international footballers
Women's association football defenders
ŽFK Spartak Subotica players